Hindol is a Hindustani classical raga.

Hindol may also refer to:

Hindol State, a former Princely State in India
Hindol, Bhiwani, a village in the Indian state of Haryana
Hindol, Odisha, a town in the Indian state of Odisha